Triathlon at the 2018 Asian Games was held at the JSC Lake Jakabaring, Palembang, Indonesia, from 31 August to 2 September. Both men and women competed in individual events, plus a mixed-gendered relay event.

The individual triathlon contained three components: a 1.5 km swim, 40 km cycle, and a 10 km run. The relay event featured teams of four competitors, where each completed a 300 m swim, a 6.3 km cycle, and a 2.1 km run.

Schedule

Medalists

Medal table

Participating nations
A total of 81 athletes from 22 nations competed in triathlon at the 2018 Asian Games:

References

External links
Triathlon at the 2018 Asian Games
Official Result Book – Triathlon

 
2018
2018 Asian Games events
Asian Games
2018 Asian Games